The Eureka Sound Group is a geologic group in Nunavut. It preserves fossils dating back to the Paleogene period.

See also

 List of fossiliferous stratigraphic units in Nunavut

References
 

Paleogene Nunavut